European Square may refer to:
 European Square, Kyiv, a square in Kyiv
 Square of Europe, a square in Moscow 
 Plaza de Europa, a square in Barcelona

See also 
 :Category:Squares in Europe